Abbasabad Molla Reza (also Romanized as ‘Abbāsābād Mollā Reẕā; also known as ‘Abbāsābād) is a village in Nehzatabad Rural District, in the Central District of Rudbar-e Jonubi County, Kerman Province, Iran. At the 2006 census, its population was 1,074, in 217 families.

References 

Populated places in Rudbar-e Jonubi County